The 1960 Sugar Bowl to the featured the second-ranked Ole Miss Rebels, and the third ranked LSU Tigers. LSU was the defending national champion, playing in its home state, but faced a rematch of a tough 7–3 win in a regular season game.

After a scoreless first quarter of play, Ole Miss scored on a 43-yard touchdown pass from quarterback Jake Gibbs to Cowboy Woodruff, as the Rebels took a 7–0 lead. In the third quarter, Bobby Franklin of Ole Miss threw an 18-yard touchdown pass to Larry Grantham as Ole Miss led 14–0. In the fourth quarter, Franklin threw a 9-yard touchdown pass to George Blair as Ole Miss led 21–0. They held on to win the game.

The story of the game was Ole Miss's relentless defense, that may have been one of the best in any bowl game's history. It held LSU to just 74 yards of total offense, including negative 15 rushing yards, and never let LSU inside the Ole Miss 38-yard line during the game. Bobby Franklin was named the game's MVP.

See also
 Magnolia Bowl

References

Sugar Bowl
Sugar Bowl
LSU Tigers football bowl games
Ole Miss Rebels football bowl games
Sugar Bowl
Sugar Bowl